Lübbenau is a railway station located in Lübbenau, Germany. The station is located on the Berlin–Görlitz railway and Lübbenau–Kamenz railway. The train services are operated by DB Regio Nordost and Ostdeutsche Eisenbahn (ODEG).

Train services 
The station is serves by the following service(s):

Intercity services (IC 56) Norddeich - Emden - Oldenburg - Bremen - Hannover - Braunschweig - Magdeburg - Brandenburg - Berlin - Cottbus
Regional services  Wismar – Schwerin – Wittenberge – Nauen – Berlin – Königs Wusterhausen – Lübben – Cottbus
Local services  Eberswalde – Berlin – Königs Wusterhausen – Lübben – Senftenberg

Until mid-December 2014 the station was also served by EuroCity "Wawel", which used to run once daily between Berlin Hauptbahnhof and Wrocław Główny.

References

External links

Railway stations in Brandenburg
Railway stations in Germany opened in 1866
1866 establishments in Prussia
Buildings and structures in Oberspreewald-Lausitz